Chandler station is a closed railway station in Chandler, Quebec, Canada. Located at Rue de la Plage, it is a shelter with no ticket agent and is wheelchair-accessible. , the Gaspé train is not running; the closest passenger rail service is provided at the Matapédia station. It is unknown if or when service to Gaspé will resume.

References

External links

Via Rail stations in Quebec
Railway stations in Gaspésie–Îles-de-la-Madeleine
Disused railway stations in Canada
Railway stations closed in 2013